Bangaru Kodipetta is a 2014 Telugu language romantic comedy film directed by Raj Pippalla and produced by Sunitha Tati under Guru Films and starring Navdeep and Swati Reddy. The title of this film is based on a song from Gharana Mogudu (1992).

Cast
 Navdeep as Vamsi
 Swati Reddy as Bhanumati Pinisetti
 Harsha Vardhan
 Santosh Sobhan as Venu
 Ram as Yerra Babu 
 Laxman as Dora Babu
 Sanchalana as Sruthi

Production
Navdeep and Swati are main lead in this film with popular action choreographers Ram - Laxman in vital roles. The first look of the film was revealed on 24 July 2012. On 13 November 2012 sources reported that the shooting of the film was completed.

Soundtrack 
The movie's audio was released by Samantha on 3 July 2013. The soundtrack of Bangaru Kodipetta was composed by Mahesh Shankar.

Release
The film got U/A Certificate from India's film censor board. The film's makers announced that its release date of 27 February 2014 has now been postponed to release on 7 March. Later it was dubbed into Tamil titled as Love Pannunga Life Nalla Irukkum.

Awards and nominations

References 

2014 films
2010s Telugu-language films